Jacques N'Guea Énongué (8 November 1955 – 31 May 2022) was a Cameroonian footballer who played as a forward. He appeared internationally for the Cameroon national team between 1977 and 1984, participating in Cameroon's first FIFA World Cup in 1982 and its win of the 1984 African Cup of Nations. At club level, he played for Ouragan de Loum and Canon Yaoundé.

Death
N'Guea died in Yaoundé on 31 May 2022, aged 66, after a long illness.

References

External links
FIFA profile

1955 births
2022 deaths
Cameroonian footballers
Association football forwards
Cameroon international footballers
1982 FIFA World Cup players
1982 African Cup of Nations players
1984 African Cup of Nations players
Canon Yaoundé players